The 2015 U.S. Figure Skating Championships were held at the Greensboro Coliseum in Greensboro, North Carolina from January 18–25, 2015. Medals were awarded in the disciplines of men's singles, ladies singles, pair skating, and ice dancing at the senior, junior, novice, intermediate and juvenile levels. The results were part of the U.S. selection criteria for the 2015 World Championships and 2015 Four Continents Championships.

Qualifying events 
Competitors qualified at regional and sectional competitions held from October to November 2014 or earned a bye. At the end of November, U.S. Figure Skating published the list of skaters who had qualified for the U.S. Championships.

Medal summary

Senior

Junior

Novice

Intermediate

Juvenile

Senior results

Senior men

Senior ladies

Senior pairs

Senior ice dance

Junior results

Junior men

Junior ladies

Junior pairs

Junior ice dance

Novice results

Novice men

Novice ladies

Novice pairs

Novice ice dance

Intermediate results

Intermediate men

Intermediate ladies

Intermediate pairs

Intermediate ice dance

Juvenile results

Juvenile boys

Juvenile girls

Juvenile pairs

Juvenile ice dance

International team selections

Four Continents
The team for the 2015 Four Continents Championships was announced on January 25, 2015 as follows:

World Junior Championships 
The team for the 2015 World Junior Championships was announced on January 25, 2015 as follows:

World Championships 
The team for the 2015 World Championships was announced on January 25, 2015 as follows:

References

External links
 2015 Prudential United States Figure Skating Championships results  at IceNetwork
 Schedule of events at IceNetwork

2015
2015 in figure skating
2015 in American sports
U.S. Figure Skating
January 2015 sports events in the United States
Greensboro, North Carolina
Sports competitions in Greensboro, North Carolina